Edwin T. McKnight  was a politician who served on the Boston City Council, in the Massachusetts House of Representatives; and as a member, and President of, the Massachusetts Senate.

Early life
McKnight was born on October 11, 1869 in Kings County, New Brunswick.

Education
McKnight attended Fredericton, N. B. Normal School; the University of New Brunswick, and Harvard Law School

See also
 1917 Massachusetts legislature
 1918 Massachusetts legislature
 1919 Massachusetts legislature
 1920 Massachusetts legislature

References

1869 births
Boston City Council members
Republican Party members of the Massachusetts House of Representatives
Republican Party Massachusetts state senators
Presidents of the Massachusetts Senate
1935 deaths
Harvard Law School alumni
University of New Brunswick alumni